Gaustad Chapel is a chapel of the Church of Norway in Hustadvika Municipality in Møre og Romsdal county, Norway. It is located in the village of Gaustad, just south of Vevang. It is an annex chapel for the Eide parish which is part of the Molde domprosti (deanery) in the Diocese of Møre. The white, wooden church was built in a octagonal design in 2001. The church seats about 150 people.

History
The chapel was consecrated by Bishop Odd Bondevik on 17 June 2001. The chapel is decorated with glass art made by Anne Brit Krag and stone art with stone from the Nås quarry. The altarpiece, pulpit, and baptismal font are made of stone.

See also
List of churches in Møre

References

Hustadvika (municipality)
Churches in Møre og Romsdal
Octagonal churches in Norway
Wooden churches in Norway
21st-century Church of Norway church buildings
Churches completed in 2001
2001 establishments in Norway